Lenawee is a word coined by Henry Schoolcraft and may refer to:

Lenawee County, Michigan
Lenawee (car), manufactured from 1903 to 1904

Henry Schoolcraft neologisms